The folk theory of democracy is the belief system that the voting public supports, elects and embraces candidates who reflect the collective "wishes and desires" of the people.  Extracted from Democracy for Realists;
"the idea that citizens make coherent and intelligible policy decisions, on which governments then act – bears no relationship to how it really works. Or could ever work".

References

Democracy
Folklore
Political theories